Laurentina is the southern terminus of Line B of the Rome Metro. It is in the Giuliano-Dalmata quarter at the crossroads of Via Laurentina, Via di Vigna Murata, Viale Luca Gaurico and Largo Vittime delle Foibe Istriane The first station on the site was begun in the 1930s, but only completed and opened in 1955. This was demolished in the 1980s, and the present building opened in 1990. It is also the terminus for several suburban bus routes.

Surroundings 
Sant'Eugenio Hospital
Cecchignola
Via Laurentina
Via di Vigna Murata
Tre Fontane Abbey

External links 

ATAC
Met.Ro S.p.A

Railway stations opened in 1955
Railway stations opened in 1990
Rome Metro Line B stations
1980s disestablishments in Italy
1955 establishments in Italy
1990 establishments in Italy
Rome Q. XXXI Giuliano-Dalmata
Railway stations in Italy opened in the 20th century